El Sauzal is a town and a municipality in the northeastern part of the island of Tenerife, Canary Islands, Spain. It is located on the north coast, 12 km west of San Cristóbal de La Laguna, 13 km northeast of La Orotava and 18 km west of the island's capital, Santa Cruz de Tenerife. The TF-5 motorway passes through the municipality. The population is 9,076 (2013) and the area is 18.31 km².

Historical population

People
 Mary of Jesus de León y Delgado (23 March 1643 – 15 February 1731), nun and mystic, whose body remains incorrupt.
 Paulino Rivero Baute (1952 –), politician and president of the Government of Canary Islands in the 2007-2010 and 2011-2015 legislatures.

See also
List of municipalities in Santa Cruz de Tenerife

References 

Municipalities in Tenerife